XME may refer to:

 Median language (ISO 639 language code: xme)
 Australian airExpress (ICAO airline code: XME)
 Maubeuge Aerodrome (IATA airport code: XME), Departement Nord, France; see List of airports in France
 Marble Mountain Ski Resort meteorological station (Environment Canada station code XME), Mount Musgrave, Steady Brook, Long Range Mountains, Newfoundland Island, Newfoundland and Labrador, Canada
 XME, the region code for Malaysia on the Samsung Galaxy brand device CSC list

See also

  
 XM3 (disambiguation)
 Tenth (disambiguation)